Stožice may refer to:

Czech Republic
Stožice, Czech Republic, a municipality and village in the South Bohemian Region

Slovenia
Stožice (Ljubljana), a part of Ljubljana
Stožice Sports Park, a multi-use sports complex in Stožice
Stožice Stadium, a multi-purpose stadium in the sports park
Arena Stožice, a multi-purpose indoor arena in the sports park
Nove Stožice, a housing development in Ljubljana